List of diseases of coconut palms (Cocos nucifera):

Bacterial diseases

Fungal diseases

Virus and viroid

Phytoplasmal diseases

Miscellaneous diseases and disorders

Further reading 
 This review...
 

 ...cites this study:

References 

 Common Names of Diseases, The American Phytopathological Society

Coconut palm
Coconut palm diseases